Murray Merle Schwartz (March 23, 1931 – January 11, 2013) was a United States district judge of the United States District Court for the District of Delaware.

Education and career

Born in Ephrata, Pennsylvania, Schwartz received a Bachelor of Science degree from the University of Pennsylvania, Wharton School of Business in 1952 and a Bachelor of Laws from the University of Pennsylvania Law School in 1955. He received a Master of Laws from the University of Virginia School of Law in 1982. He was a law clerk for Judge Caleb Merrill Wright of the United States District Court for the District of Delaware from 1955 to 1957. He was in private practice in Wilmington, Delaware from 1958 to 1974. He was a Referee in Bankruptcy (part-time) for the United States District Court for the District of Delaware from 1969 to 1974.

Federal judicial service

Schwartz was nominated by President Richard Nixon on March 21, 1974, to a seat on the United States District Court for the District of Delaware vacated by Judge Caleb Merrill Wright. He was confirmed by the United States Senate on April 5, 1974, and received his commission on April 17, 1974. He served as Chief Judge from 1985 to 1989. He assumed senior status due to a certified disability on July 24, 1989. His service terminated on January 11, 2013, due to his death in Hockessin, Delaware.

See also
List of Jewish American jurists

References

Sources
 

1931 births
2013 deaths
Judges of the United States District Court for the District of Delaware
United States district court judges appointed by Richard Nixon
20th-century American judges
University of Pennsylvania Law School alumni
Wharton School of the University of Pennsylvania alumni
University of Virginia School of Law alumni
People from Ephrata, Pennsylvania
People from Lancaster County, Pennsylvania